Major League may refer to:

Sport 

 Major League Baseball, the highest level of play in professional baseball in the U.S. and Canada.
 Major League Cricket, a U.S. company that runs professional cricket competitions
 Major League Eating,  organizes top-level competitive eaters, eating events, television specials and merchandise, mostly in the U.S.
 Major League Gaming, a professional league dedicated to video game competition in the U.S.
 Major League Lacrosse, the highest level of play in professional field lacrosse in the U.S.
 Major League Quidditch, the highest level of play in quidditch in the U.S. and Canada
 Major League Rugby, the highest level of play in professional rugby union in the U.S. and Canada.
 Major League Soccer, the highest level of play in professional soccer in the U.S. and Canada.
 Major League Wrestling,  a popular professional wrestling promotion that described itself as hybrid wrestling
 Major Hockey League (disambiguation)
 Major Soccer League, an indoor soccer league in the U.S. from 1978 to 1992
 Tonga Major League, the highest level of association football in Tonga
 Ukrainian Major League, former semi-professional ice hockey league in Ukraine, known only as the "Major League"

Arts and entertainment

Films 
 Major League (film), 1989
 Major League II, 1994
 Major League: Back to the Minors, 1998

Music 
 Major League (band), a rock band from New Jersey, U.S.
 Major League, a musical project of Armin van Buuren with Tiësto
 Major Leagues (EP), by Pavement, 1999, and a song